The 2018–19 season was Al-Ittihad's 43rd consecutive season in the top flight of Saudi football and 92nd year in existence as a football club. Along with the Pro League, the club competed in the King Cup, the Sheikh Zayed Cup, and the Champions League. The season covers the period from 1 July 2018 to 30 June 2019.

Players

Squad information

Transfers

In

Loans in

Out
{| class="wikitable" style="text-align:left"
|-
! Date
! Pos.
! Name
! New club
! Fee
! Source
|-
| 4 June 2018
| DF
|  Turki Al Jalvan
| colspan=2|Released
| 
|-
| 4 June 2018
| DF
|  Faisel Al-Kharaa
| colspan=2|Released
| 
|-
| 4 June 2018
| MF
|  Fahad Al Ansari
|  Al-Qadsia
| End of loan
| 
|-
| 4 June 2018
| MF
|  Ahmed Al-Aoufi
| colspan=2|Released
| 
|-
| 4 June 2018
| MF
|  Turki Al-Khodair
| colspan=2|Released
| 
|-
| 4 June 2018
| MF
|  Kahraba
|  Zamalek
| End of loan
| 
|-
| 6 June 2018
| DF
|  Yassin Hamzah
|  Al-Fateh
| Free
| 
|-
| 10 June 2018
| MF
|  Rabee Sufyani
|  Al-Taawoun
| Free
| 
|-
| 11 July 2018
| MF
|  Yahya Khormi
|  Al-Taawoun
| Free
| 
|-
| 22 July 2018
| DF
|  Adnan Fallatah
|  Al-Qadsiah
| Free
| 
|-
| 23 July 2018
| GK
|  Mohammed Al-Zahrani
|  Al-Jabalain
| Free
| 
|-
| 27 July 2018
| DF
|  Majed Al-Khaibari
|  Al-Shoulla
| Free
| 
|-
| 28 July 2018
| MF
|  Ibrahim Al-Shehri
|  Al-Ain
| Free
| 
|-
| 29 July 2018
| GK
|  Ali Al-Ameri
|  Al-Kawkab
| Free
| 
|-
| 29 July 2018
| GK
|  Hani Al-Nahedh
|  Al-Qaisumah
| Free
| 
|-
| 30 July 2018
| MF
|  Omar Asem
|  Najran
| Free
| 
|-
| 9 August 2018
| DF
|  Awadh Khrees
|  Al-Faisaly
| Free
| <ref>{{cite web|url=https://twitter.com/AlFaisaly/status/1027631492447592454|title=إدارة النادي تنهي إجراءات التوقيع مع اللاعب  عوض خريص '|accessdate=21 August 2018}}</ref>
|-
| 14 August 2018
| MF
|  Ahmed Al-Nadhri
|  Al-Fateh
| Free
| 
|-
| 25 August 2018
| MF
|  Ahmed Belkhair
|  Al-Ain
| Free
| 
|-
| 6 September 2018
| FW
|  Ahmed Akaïchi
|  Étoile du Sahel
| Free
| 
|-
| 26 December 2018
| DF
|  Abdullah Al-Shammari
|  Al-Wehda
| Free
| 
|-
| 27 December 2018
| DF
|  Thiago Carleto
| Released
| Free
| 
|-
| 20 January 2019
| DF
|  Bader Al-Nakhli
|  Al-Batin
| Free
| 
|-
| 24 January 2019
| DF
|  Hassan Muath
|  Al-Shabab
| Free
| 
|-
| 4 February 2019
| DF
|  Hussein Halawani 
|  Al-Tai
| Free
| 
|-
|}

Loans out

Pre-season and friendlies

Competitions
Overview

GoalscorersLast Updated: 21 May 2019AssistsLast Updated: 21 May 2019Clean sheetsLast Updated: 7 May 2019''

References

Ittihad FC seasons
Ittihad